The 2013–14 Virginia Tech Hokies men's basketball team represented Virginia Polytechnic Institute and State University during the 2013–14 NCAA Division I men's basketball season. They were led by second year head coach James Johnson and played their home games at Cassell Coliseum. They were a member of the Atlantic Coast Conference. They finished the season 9–22, 2–16 in ACC play to finish in last place. They lost in the first round of the ACC tournament to Miami (FL).

On March 17, head coach James Johnson was fired. He compiled a record of 22–41 in two seasons. On March 21, he was replaced by Buzz Williams, most recently the head coach at Marquette.

Recruiting class

Roster

Schedule

|-
!colspan=12 style="background:#660000; color:#CC5500;"| Regular season

|-
!colspan=9 style="background:#660000; color:#CC5500;"| ACC tournament

References

Virginia Tech Hokies men's basketball seasons
Virginia Tech
Virginia Tech
Virginia Tech